The University of North Texas at Dallas (UNTD) is a public university in Dallas, Texas. It opened in 2000 as a branch campus of the University of North Texas, offering upper-level undergraduate and graduate courses in multiple disciplines. In 2009 it became a free-standing university, offering a full undergraduate program as well as graduate work. UNT Dallas is the only public university based within Dallas city limits.

History and development

In 1997 State Sen. Royce West suggested a feasibility study for a state university in southern Dallas County  an area of Dallas County that is predominantly African American and was then served only by the private Paul Quinn College. The campus,  which was to become the first public university within Dallas city limits, was launched at a temporary location in the spring 2000 semester with an enrollment of 204 part-time students, or a full-time equivalent enrollment of 55.

A 2001 bill passed by the Texas Legislature and signed into law by Governor Rick Perry authorized the UNT System to establish UNT Dallas as an independent university once enrollment reached 2,500. A 2003 bill changed the requirement to the equivalent of 1,000 full-time students for one semester.

A ground-breaking ceremony for the first building on the future campus took place in October 2005. The first , permanent building on the UNT Dallas Campus site was occupied in January 2007. The building was made possible by a state tuition revenue bond (TRB) initiative of $25.5 million. Further funding from the same source was used to construct the second building, and construction began in 2009.

Enrollment on the UNT Dallas Campus initially grew at an average annual rate of 14 percent per year and reached the necessary full-time equivalent of 1,000 students during the spring semester of 2007. In April 2009, the Texas Higher Education Coordinating Board certified this enrollment and granted UNT Dallas status as an independent general academic institution.  Freshmen and sophomores were admitted for the first time in the Fall of 2010.

From the beginning, the head of the campus was  John Ellis Price. Initially he was designated the UNT Dallas Campus chief executive officer; the position was later upgraded first to vice chancellor, then "president designate"   and finally, President. Price announced in July 2012 that he would not remain in his job after his contract ends in August 2013. On March 26, 2013, the UNT Board of Regents announced that Dr. Ronald T. Brown would become the next President, effective July 1, 2013. On August 1, 2015, Ronald T. Brown was moved to a new position within the UNT System and former Dallas Morning News Editor, Bob Mong, was instated as UNT Dallas' third President.

2016 
2016 brought many major developments to the campus. The campus broke ground on its first residence hall in August. The building will house its first students in Fall 2017. Full-time enrollment for Fall 2016 jumped to more than 3,000 students, an increase of almost 22% over the previous year. In October, DART completed the extension of their Blue Line bringing rail service directly to the UNT Dallas campus. This opens the door to those living along the Blue Line corridor as far north as Rowlett.

The SERCH Institute at UNT Dallas (Service Education Research Community Hope) partnered with Mayor Mike Rawlings’ GrowSouth initiative and began working with 10 AmeriCorps VISTA members working in approximately 32 neighborhoods in southern Dallas. Their efforts are aimed at strengthening neighborhoods and build the internal capacity of their neighborhood associations.

Also in Fall 2016, Dr. John Gasko, Dean of the School of Education at UNT Dallas, officially launched the Emerging Teacher Institute (ETI) whose mission is focused on the concept of preparing teachers ‘…to effectively teach and reach students in high-need classrooms and remain stable in the face of adversity over time’. Michael L. Williams, former Commissioner of the Texas Education Agency, is working with Dr. Gasko to increase the university's partnerships with area school districts. Williams is UNT Dallas’ inaugural Distinguished Leader-in-Residence.

In December 2016, UNT Dallas announced the hiring of Dr. Betty Stewart as Provost and Vice President of Academic Affairs.

UNT Dallas College of Law

The UNT System opened a law school in downtown Dallas in 2014 and received provisional accreditation by the American Bar Association in 2017.The school obtained full ABA accreditation in 2022.

Campus demographics
As of fall 2019, the student body is 52% Hispanic, 28% African-American, 14% Caucasian, 2% Asian, and 4% Other.  Women make up 67% of the student body and men make up 33%. UNT Dallas faculty is 48% Caucasian, 26% African-American, 10% Hispanic and 6% Asian.

Development
The campus developed by recruited senior faculty members, with the intention of being "a comprehensive metropolitan university."

As growth slowed, and as the student body remain predominantly part-time, not rising above the initial 1,000 full-time equivalents,  the management consultants Bain & Company were asked to develop a plan for development. According to the Chronicle of Higher Education, their plan, proposed in 2012, calls for "a narrow set of career-focused majors in fields like business, information technology, and criminal justice, as well as for a year-round trimester calendar. It would de-emphasize research by faculty members so they could teach as many as 12 courses per year, and it would rely on heavy use of so-called hybrid courses, which would replace some face-to-face teaching with online instruction."

Athletics 
The North Texas–Dallas (UNT Dallas) athletic teams are called the Trailblazers. The university is a member of the National Association of Intercollegiate Athletics (NAIA), primarily competing in the Sooner Athletic Conference (SAC) as a provisional member since the 2020–21 academic year (where the school began its athletic program, while achieving NAIA full member status in 2021–22). The Trailblazers had applied for membership with the NAIA and was accepted into the association in March 2020. The NAIA membership bid was endorsed from the SAC, and UNT Dallas awaits on a decision on conference membership during the conference's spring meetings. 

UNT Dallas competes in six intercollegiate varsity sports: Men's sports include basketball, cross country and track & field; while women's sports include basketball, cross country and track & field.

Athletics expansion
The university plans to add men's and women's soccer at a later time after the initial launch of the athletic program. Josh Howard was hired as the men's basketball coach in April 2020.

The decision to add the athletic program was announced after the students voted on a $7-per credit hour athletics fee to help fund the department and associated costs. The vote comes after the university established the foundation for collegiate athletics, including the hiring of an athletic director. The basketball teams will initially compete at nearby Cedar Valley College until the university constructs an on-campus sports-and-events center. In addition to the special events center, the university's master plan includes a cross country course at the eastern end of the campus as well as future projects such as a baseball/softball complex, tennis courts, and department office space and fitness space for athletics and recreational use.

References

External links
 
 UNT Dallas athletics website

 
University of North Texas System
Universities and colleges in Dallas
Educational institutions established in 2000
University of North Texas Dallas
2000 establishments in Texas